Kokyar (Kɵkyar, Көкяр, كۆكيار, Kök-yar, Kök-yār, Pinyin: Kùkèyá; , Kēkèyà Xiāng) is a township headquartered at a small oasis at the base of the Kunlun Mountains in southern Kargilik County, Kashgar Prefecture, southwestern Xinjiang, China.

History
In 1958, Kokyar Commune was established.

In 1985, Kokyar Commune became Kokyar Township.

It took several days for rescue operations to reopen the road into the village. 352 residents were relocated.

In 2016-2017, Akemeiqite village (阿克美其特村) was disestablished and Nu'er'abati was established, Amanxia (阿曼夏村) was disestablished and Halasitan village was established, and Muchang village was established.

In 2019, a cooperative farm was established in Halasitan village.

Geography

". . . a narrow strip of ground less than half a mile across and under five miles in length, enclosed between absolutely barren slopes at the bottom of a narrow valley. The people, reckoned at about two hundred households, depend largely for their sustenance on cattle and sheep kept far away in the mountains. Nor is the configuration of the valley such that a much extended cultivation can be assumed even for an earlier period when a moister climate prevailed."

Kokyar was the first oasis reached in the Taklamakan basin after travelling the winter route north from the Karakoram Pass via Bazar Dara or from northern Hunza Valley to Yarkand along the frozen Yarkand River.

To the north, Kokyar Township borders Kargilik Town (Kageleke, Qaghiliq), to the east Ushsharbash Town (Wuxiabashi), and to the west Chipan Township (Qipan).

Administrative divisions

, Kokyar Township includes eighteen villages divided into four areas (Mandarin Chinese pinyin-derived names except where noted):

Areas:
 Kekeya, Momuke, Guosasi, Xihefu

Villages:
 Ying'awati 
 Kekeya 
 Outunsu / Otan-su / Otansu 
 Pusa
 Nu'er'abati
 Yusaisi 
 Ta'er'agezi 
 Guosasi 
 Aqikebailedu'er 
 Kalayoulegun 
 Momuke 
 Dunzila 
 Yusilüshi 
 Halasitan
 Igizya (Yigeziya;  / ) 
 Awatibage 
 Yanbuke 
 Muchang

As of 2009, there were seventeen villages in Kokyar:
Ying'awati (英阿瓦提村), Kekeya (柯克亚村), Outunsu (欧吞苏村), Pusa (普萨村), Akmeqit / Akemeiqite (阿克美其特村) , Yusaisi (玉赛斯村), Ta'er'agezi (塔尔阿格孜村), Guosasi (果萨斯村), Aqikebailedu'er (阿其克拜勒都尔村), Kalayoulegun (喀拉尤勒滚村), Momuke (莫木克村), Dunzila (墩孜拉村), Yusilüshi (玉斯吕什村), Amanxia (阿曼夏村) , Yigeziya (依格孜亚村), Awatibage (阿瓦提巴格村), Yanbuke (颜布克村)

Demographics 

, 96.9% of the residents of Kokyar Township were Uyghur.

Some Mountain Tajiks (China) live in Kokyar Township.

Economy
There are orchards containing apricot, mulberry and other fruit trees and fields of wheat and oats and stands of willow and poplar trees. The people produce excellent felts which are famous throughout Turkestan which obviously contribute significantly to the economy. The people speak 'Taghlik' or "hill Turki" (Uyghur). There are many long-lived trees in the area.

As of 2015, persons engaged in agriculture made up 93.1% of the population of the township and there was 16,800 mu of arable land.

Kokyar (Kekeya) Oil and Gas Field was discovered in the 1970s.

Transportation
 China National Highway 219

Historical maps
Historical English-language maps including Kokyar:

Notes

References

Further reading
Hill, John E. (2009) Through the Jade Gate to Rome: A Study of the Silk Routes during the Later Han Dynasty, 1st to 2nd Centuries CE. BookSurge, Charleston, South Carolina. .
 Stein, M. Aurel (1921). Serindia: Detailed report of explorations in Central Asia and westernmost China, 5 vols. M. Aurel Stein. 1921. London. Oxford. Clarendon Press. Reprint: Delhi. Motilal Banarsidass. 1980.

Populated places in Xinjiang
Oases of China
Township-level divisions of Xinjiang